Chamaraja Wodeyar VII (1704 – 1734) was the seventeenth maharaja of the Kingdom of Mysore. He ruled only for two years, from 1732 to 1734.

Adoption and coronation 
He was son of Devaraj Urs of Ankanhalli and adopted by Maharani Devajamma and Maharaja Dodda Krishnaraja Wodeyar I.

19 March 1732, he ascended the throne at Seringapatam. But on 10 June 1734 he was deposed and imprisoned with his wife for opposing the dalvoys, his late father's cousin Nanjaraja and commander Devaraja. He died in prison at Kabaladurga, in the same year. He was succeeded by his brother Krishnaraja Wadiyar II.

See also
 Wodeyar dynasty

1704 births
1734 deaths
Kings of Mysore
Chamaraja 07
18th-century Indian monarchs